Omorgus stellatus is a beetle of the family Trogidae.

References 

stellatus